Macomer is a town and comune of Sardinia (Italy) in the province of Nuoro. It is situated on the southern ascent to the central plateau (the Campeda) of this part of Sardinia, at the junction of narrow-gauge lines branching from the main railroad line running east to Nuoro and west to Bosa.

The district, especially the Campeda, is well suited for grazing and horse and cattle breeding, which is carried on to a considerable extent.

History
Macomer, known to the Greek geographer Ptolemy as "Macopsissa," has been inhabited since antiquity. 
In 1478 was the scene of the historical battle between the Sardinians and the Aragonese, which ended the independence of Sardinia. 
In 1767, under the Kingdom of Sardinia, it became the capital of the Marquisate of Marghine. The Marquisate included the nearby villages of Birori, Bolotana, Borore, Bortigali, Dualchi, Lei, Mulargia, Noragugume and Silanus.

In 1949, a statue called The Venus of Macomer was discovered in a cave located in "Marras" area, in a gorge of the river S'Adde. 
The artifact depicts a Goddess Mother dating back to the Palaeolithic period. It is currently kept in the National Archaeological Museum of Cagliari.

Nowadays, Macomer is a destination for tourists who want to admire the beautiful landscape around the city.

Main sights
The region is richer in the bronze-age towers known as nuraghi than any other part of Sardinia.

The old parish church of San Pantaleone has three Roman mile-stones in front of it, belonging to the Roman high-road from Carales to Turris Libisonis. A modern road now follows the ancient one.
Recently an ethnographic museum called "Le Arti Antiche" (The ancient Arts) has been opened, where it is possible to see tools traditionally used for agriculture and livestock, folk costumes, and photographs. The Monte di Sant'Antonio (St. Anthony's Mountain) has a great historical and naturalistic importance; on 13 June of every year the anniversary of the Saint of Padua is celebrated there.

References

Cities and towns in Sardinia